Nitrosation is a process of converting organic compounds into nitroso derivatives, i.e. compounds containing the R-NO functionality.

C-Nitroso compounds
C-Nitroso compounds, such as nitrosobenzene, are typically prepared by oxidation of hydroxylamines:
RNHOH + [O] → RNO + H2O

S-Nitroso compounds
S-Nitroso compounds (S-nitrosothiols) are typically prepared by condensation of a thiol and nitrous acid:
RSH + HONO → RSNO + H2O

O-Nitroso compounds
O-Nitroso compounds are similar to S-nitroso compounds, but are less reactive because the oxygen atom is less nucleophilic than the sulfur atom. The formation of an alkyl nitrite from an alcohol and nitrous acid is a common example:
ROH + HONO → RONO + H2O

N-Nitrosamines 
N-Nitrosamines, including the carcinogenic variety, arise from the reaction of nitrite sources with amino compounds, which can happen during the curing of meat. Typically this reaction proceeds via the attack of the nitrosonium electrophile on an amine: 
NO2− + 2 H+ → NO+ + H2O
R2NH + NO+ → R2N-NO + H+

Formation of an N-nitrosamine:
The nitrosamine can then lose water through protonation to form diazonium cation, which is a very useful intermediate to form different compounds.

References

External links
 Nitrosation of Amines

Organic reactions